Wearable technology is any technology that is designed to be used while worn. Common types of wearable technology include smartwatches and smartglasses. Wearable electronic devices are often close to or on the surface of the skin, where they detect, analyze, and transmit information such as vital signs, and/or ambient data and which allow in some cases immediate biofeedback to the wearer.

Wearable devices such as activity trackers are an example of the Internet of Things, since "things" such as electronics, software, sensors, and connectivity are effectors that enable objects to exchange data (including data quality) through the internet with a manufacturer, operator, and/or other connected devices, without requiring human intervention.

Wearable technology has a variety of use cases which is growing as the technology is developed and the market expands. Wearables are popular in consumer electronics, most commonly in the form factors of smartwatches, smart rings, and implants. Apart from commercial uses, wearable technology is being incorporated into navigation systems, advanced textiles (e-textiles), and healthcare. As wearable technology is being proposed for use in critical applications, like other technology, it is vetted for its reliability and security properties.

History 
In the 1500s, German inventor Peter Henlein (1485-1542) created small watches that were worn as necklaces. A century later, pocket watches grew in popularity as waistcoats became fashionable for men. Wristwatches were created in the late 1600s but were worn mostly by women as bracelets.

In the late 1800s, the first wearable hearing aids were introduced.

In 1904, aviator Alberto Santos-Dumont pioneered the modern use of the wristwatch.

In the 1970s, calculator watches became available, reaching the peak of their popularity in the 1980s.

From the early 2000s, wearable cameras were being used as part of a growing sousveillance movement. In 2008, Ilya Fridman incorporated a hidden Bluetooth microphone into a pair of earrings.

In 2010, Fitbit released its first step counter. Wearable technology which tracks information such as walking and heart rate is part of the quantified self movement.

In 2013 McLear, also known as NFC Ring, released the first widely used advanced wearable device. The smart ring could pay with bitcoin, unlock other devices, transfer personally identifying information, and other features. McLear owns the earliest patent, filed in 2012, which covers all smart rings, with Joe Prencipe of Seattle, WA as the sole inventor.

In 2013, one of the first widely available smartwatches was the Samsung Galaxy Gear. Apple followed in 2015 with the Apple Watch.

Prototypes 
From 1991 to 1997, Rosalind Picard and her students, Steve Mann and Jennifer Healey, at the MIT Media Lab designed, built, and demonstrated data collection and decision making from "Smart Clothes" that monitored continuous physiological data from the wearer. These "smart clothes", "smart underwear", "smart shoes", and smart jewellery collected data that related to affective state and contained or controlled physiological sensors and environmental sensors like cameras and other devices.

At the same time, also at the MIT Media Lab, Thad Starner and Alex "Sandy" Pentland develop augmented reality.  In 1997, their smartglass prototype is featured on 60 Minutes and enables rapid web search and instant messaging.  Though the prototype's glasses are nearly as streamlined as modern smartglasses, the processor was a computer worn in a backpack – the most lightweight solution available at the time.

In 2009, Sony Ericsson teamed up with the London College of Fashion for a contest to design digital clothing. The winner was a cocktail dress with Bluetooth technology making it light up when a call is received.

Zach "Hoeken" Smith of MakerBot fame made keyboard pants during a "Fashion Hacking" workshop at a New York City creative collective.

The Tyndall National Institute in Ireland developed a "remote non-intrusive patient monitoring" platform which was used to evaluate the quality of the data generated by the patient sensors and how the end users may adopt to the technology.

More recently, London-based fashion company CuteCircuit created costumes for singer Katy Perry featuring LED lighting so that the outfits would change color both during stage shows and appearances on the red carpet such as the dress Katy Perry wore in 2010 at the MET Gala in NYC. In 2012, CuteCircuit created the world's first dress to feature Tweets, as worn by singer Nicole Scherzinger.

In 2010, McLear, also known as NFC Ring, developed the first advanced wearables prototype in the world, which was then fundraised on Kickstarter in 2013.

In 2014, graduate students from the Tisch School of Arts in New York designed a hoodie that sent pre-programmed text messages triggered by gesture movements.

Around the same time, prototypes for digital eyewear with heads up display (HUD) began to appear.

The US military employs headgear with displays for soldiers using a technology called holographic optics.

In 2010, Google started developing prototypes of its optical head-mounted display Google Glass, which went into customer beta in March 2013.

Usage

In the consumer space, sales of smart wristbands (aka activity trackers such as the Jawbone UP and Fitbit Flex) started accelerating in 2013. One in five American adults have a wearable device, according to the 2014 PriceWaterhouseCoopers Wearable Future Report. As of 2009, decreasing cost of processing power and other components was facilitating widespread adoption and availability.

In professional sports, wearable technology has applications in monitoring and real-time feedback for athletes. Examples of wearable technology in sport include accelerometers, pedometers, and GPS's which can be used to measure an athlete's energy expenditure and movement pattern.

In cybersecurity and financial technology, secure wearable devices have captured part of the physical security key market. McLear, also known as NFC Ring, and VivoKey developed products with one-time pass secure access control.

In health informatics, wearable devices have enabled better capturing of human health statics for data driven analysis. This has facilitated data-driven machine learning algorithms to analyse the health condition of users. For applications in health .

In business, wearable technology helps managers easily supervise employees by knowing their locations and what they are currently doing. Employees working in a warehouse also have increased safety when working around chemicals or lifting something. Smart helmets are employee safety wearables that have vibration sensors that can alert employees of possible danger in their environment.

Wearable technology and health 

Wearable technology is often used to monitor a user's health. Given that such a device is in close contact with the user, it can easily collect data. It started as soon as 1980 where first wireless ECG was invented. In the last decades, there has been substantial growth in research of e.g. textile-based, tattoo, patch, and contact lenses as well as circulation of a notion of "Quantified Self", transhumanism-related ideas, and growth of life extension research.

Wearables can be used to collect data on a user's health including:
 Heart rate
 Calories burned
 Steps walked
 Blood pressure
 Release of certain biochemicals
 Time spent exercising
 Seizures
 physical strain

These functions are often bundled together in a single unit, like an activity tracker or a smartwatch like the Apple Watch Series 2 or Samsung Galaxy Gear Sport. Devices like these are used for physical training and monitoring overall physical health, as well as alerting to serious medical conditions such as seizures (e.g. Empatica Embrace2).

Applications
Currently other applications within healthcare are being explored, such as:

 Applications for monitoring of glucose, alcohol, and lactate or blood oxygen, breath monitoring, heartbeat, heart rate and its variability, electromyography (EMG), electrocardiogram (ECG) and electroencephalogram (EEG), body temperature, pressure (e.g. in shoes), sweat rate or sweat loss, levels of uric acid and ions – e.g. for preventing fatigue or injuries or for optimizing training patterns, including via "human-integrated electronics"
 Forecasting changes in mood, stress, and health
 Measuring blood alcohol content
 Measuring athletic performance
 Monitoring how sick the user is
 Detecting early signs of infection
 Long-term monitoring of patients with heart and circulatory problems that records an electrocardiogram and is self-moistening
 Health Risk Assessment applications, including measures of frailty and risks of age-dependent diseases
 Automatic documentation of care activities
 Days-long continuous imaging of diverse organs via a wearable bioadhesive stretchable high-resolution ultrasound imaging patch or e.g. a wearable continuous heart ultrasound imager. (potential novel diagnostic and monitoring tools)
 Sleep tracking
 Cortisol monitoring for measuring stress
 Measuring relaxation or alertness, e.g. to adjust their modulation or to measure efficacy of modulation techniques

Proposed applications
Proposed applications, including applications without functional wearable prototypes, include:

 Tracking physiological changes such as stress levels and heartbeat of "experiencers" or "contactees" of the UFO-sighting, anomalous physiological effectsple ope and alien abduction/contact/sighting phenomena, including "experiencer group research"
 Pathogen detection and detection of hazardous substances
 Improving sleep via sleeping caps

Contemporary use 

Living a healthy life may not just solely be dependent on eating healthy, sleeping well, or participating in a few exercises a week. Instead, it lies far beyond just a few things and rather is deeply connected to a variety of physiological and biochemical parts of the body in relation to physical activity and living a healthy lifestyle. In the past several years, the emergence of technological devices better known as "wearable technology" has improved the ability to measure physical activity and has given simple users and e.g. cardiologists to be able to analyze parameters related to their quality of life.

Wearable technology are devices that people can wear at all times throughout the day, and also throughout the night. They help measure certain values such as heartbeat and rhythm, quality of sleep, total steps in a day, and may help recognize certain diseases such as heart disease, diabetes, and cancer. They may promote ideas on how to improve one's health and stay away from certain impending diseases. These devices give daily feedback on what to improve on and what areas people are doing well in, and this motivates and continues to push the user to keep on with their improved lifestyle.

Over time, wearable technology has impacted the health and physical activity market an immense amount as, according to ScienceDirect, "The consumer-directed wearable technology market is rapidly growing and expected to exceed $34B by 2020." This shows how the Wearable Technology sector is increasingly becoming more and more approved amongst all people who want to improve their health and quality of life.

Wearable Technology can come in all forms from watches, pads placed on the heart, devices worn around the arms, all the way to devices that can measure any amount of data just through touching the receptors of the device. In many cases, Wearable Technology is connected to an app that can relay the information right away ready to be analyzed and discussed with a cardiologist. In addition, according to the American Journal of Preventive Medicine they state, "wearables may be a low-cost, feasible, and accessible way for promoting PA." Essentially, this insinuates that Wearable Technology can be beneficial to everyone and really is not cost prohibited. Also, when consistently seeing Wearable Technology being actually utilized and worn by other people, it promotes the idea of physical activity and pushes more individuals to take part.

Wearable Technology also helps with chronic disease development and monitoring physical activity in terms of context. For example, according to the American Journal of Preventive Medicine "Wearables can be used across different chronic disease trajectory phases (e.g., pre- versus post-surgery) and linked to medical record data to obtain granular data on how activity frequency, intensity, and duration changes over the disease course and with different treatments." Wearable technology can be beneficial in tracking and helping analyze data in terms of how one is performing as time goes on, and how they may be performing with different changes in their diet, workout routine, or sleep patterns. Also, not only can Wearable Technology be helpful in measuring results pre and post surgery, but it can also help measure results as someone may be rehabbing from a chronic disease such as cancer, or heart disease, etc.

Wearable technology has the potential to create new and improved ways of how we look at health and how we actually interpret that science behind our health. It can propel us into higher levels of medicine and has already made an significant impact on how patients are diagnosed, treated, and rehabbed over time. However, extensive research still needs to be continued on how to properly integrate Wearable Technology into health care and how to best utilize it. In addition, despite the reaping benefits of Wearable Technology, a lot of research still also has to be completed in order to start transitioning Wearable Technology towards very sick high risk patients.

Sense-making of the data

While wearables can collect data in aggregate form, most of them are limited in their ability to analyze or make conclusions based on this data – thus, most are used primarily for general health information.

Exception include seizure-alerting wearables, which continuously analyze the wearer's data and make a decision about calling for help – the data collected can then provide doctors with objective evidence that they may find useful in diagnoses.

Wearables can account for individual differences, although most just collect data and apply one-size-fits-all algorithms. Software on the wearables may analyze the data directly or send the data to a nearby device(s), such as a smartphone, which processes, displays or uses the data for analysis. For analysis and real-term sense-making, machine learning algorithms can also be used.

Use in surveillance
Today, there is a growing interest to use wearables not only for individual self-tracking, but also within corporate health and wellness programs. Given that wearables create a massive data trail which employers could repurpose for objectives other than health, more and more research has begun to study privacy- and security-related issues of wearables, including related to the use for surveillance of workers. Asha Peta Thompson founded Intelligent Textiles who create woven power banks and circuitry that can be used in e-uniforms for infantry.

By form factor 
Wearable technology can exist in multiple different form factors. Popular smartwatches include the Samsung Galaxy Watch and the Apple Watch. A popular smart ring is the McLear Ring. A popular implant is the Dangerous Things NExT RFID + NFC Chip Implant, albeit such is not worn but implanted.

Head-worn 
Glasses (including but not only smartglasses) are wearable technology that are head-worn.

Headgear
Headcaps, for example to measure EEG, are head-worn. A study indicates EEG headgear could be used for neuroenhancement, concluding that a "visual flicker paradigm to entrain individuals at their own brain rhythm (i.e. peak alpha frequency)" results in  faster perceptual visual learning, maintained the day following training. There is research into various forms of neurostimulation, with various approaches including the use of wearable technology.

Another application may be supporting the induction of lucid dreams, albeit "better-controlled validation studies are necessary to prove the effectiveness".

Epidermal electronics (skin-attached) 

Epidermal electronics is an emerging field of wearable technology, termed for their properties and behaviors comparable to those of the epidermis, or outermost layer of the skin. These wearables are mounted directly onto the skin to continuously monitor physiological and metabolic processes, both dermal and subdermal. Wireless capability is typically achieved through battery, Bluetooth or NFC, making these devices convenient and portable as a type of wearable technology. Currently, epidermal electronics are being developed in the fields of fitness and medical monitoring.

Current usage of epidermal technology is limited by existing fabrication processes. Its current application relies on various sophisticated fabrication techniques such as by lithography or by directly printing on a carrier substrate before attaching directly to the body. Research into printing epidermal electronics directly on the skin is currently available as a sole study source.

The significance of epidermal electronics involves their mechanical properties, which resemble those of skin. The skin can be modeled as bilayer, composed of an epidermis having Young's Modulus (E) of 2-80 kPa and thickness of 0.3–3 mm and a dermis having E of 140-600 kPa and thickness of 0.05-1.5 mm. Together this bilayer responds plastically to tensile strains ≥ 30%, below which the skin's surface stretches and wrinkles without deforming. Properties of epidermal electronics mirror those of skin to allow them to perform in this same way. Like skin, epidermal electronics are ultrathin (h < 100 μm), low-modulus (E ~ 70 kPa), and lightweight (<10 mg/cm2), enabling them to conform to the skin without applying strain. Conformal contact and proper adhesion enable the device to bend and stretch without delaminating, deforming or failing, thereby eliminating the challenges with conventional, bulky wearables, including measurement artifacts, hysteresis, and motion-induced irritation to the skin. With this inherent ability to take the shape of skin, epidermal electronics can accurately acquire data without altering the natural motion or behavior of skin. The thin, soft, flexible design of epidermal electronics resembles that of temporary tattoos laminated on the skin. Essentially, these devices are "mechanically invisible" to the wearer.

Epidermal electronics devices may adhere to the skin via van der Waals forces or elastomeric substrates. With only van der Waals forces, an epidermal device has the same thermal mass per unit area (150 mJ/cm2K) as skin, when the skin's thickness is <500 nm. Along with van der Waals forces, the low values of E and thickness are effective in maximizing adhesion because they prevent deformation-induced detachment due to tension or compression. Introducing an elastomeric substrate can improve adhesion but will raise the thermal mass per unit area slightly. Several materials have been studied to produce these skin-like properties, including photolithography patterned serpentine gold nanofilm and patterned doping of silicon nanomembranes.

Foot-worn 
Smart shoes are an example of wearable technology that incorporate smart features into shoes. Smart shoes often work with smartphone applications to support tasks cannot be done with standard footwear. The uses include vibrating of the smart phone to tell users when and where to turn to reach their destination via Google Maps or self-lacing.

Self-lacing sneaker technology, similar to the Nike Mag in Back to the Future Part II, is another use of the smart shoe. In 2019 German footwear company Puma was recognized as one of the "100 Best Inventions of 2019" by Time for its Fi laceless shoe that uses micro-motors to adjust the fit from an iPhone. Nike also introduced a smart shoe in 2019 known as Adapt BB. The shoe featured buttons on the side to loosen or tighten the fit with a custom motor and gear, which could also be controlled by a smartphone.

Modern technologies

On April 16, 2013, Google invited "Glass Explorers" who had pre-ordered its wearable glasses at the 2012 Google I/O conference to pick up their devices. This day marked the official launch of Google Glass, a device intended to deliver rich text and notifications via a heads-up display worn as eyeglasses. The device also had a 5 MP camera and recorded video at 720p. Its various functions were activated via voice command, such as "OK Glass". The company also launched the Google Glass companion app, MyGlass. The first third-party Google Glass App came from the New York Times, which was able to read out articles and news summaries.

However, in early 2015, Google stopped selling the beta "explorer edition" of Glass to the public, after criticism of its design and the $1,500 price tag.

While optical head-mounted display technology remains a niche, two popular types of wearable devices have taken off: smartwatches and activity trackers. In 2012, ABI Research forecast that sales of smartwatches would hit $1.2 million in 2013, helped by the high penetration of smartphones in many world markets, the wide availability and low cost of MEMS sensors, energy efficient connectivity technologies such as Bluetooth 4.0, and a flourishing app ecosystem.

Crowdfunding-backed start-up Pebble reinvented the smartwatch in 2013, with a campaign running on Kickstarter that raised more than $10m in funding. At the end of 2014, Pebble announced it had sold a million devices. In early 2015, Pebble went back to its crowdfunding roots to raise a further $20m for its next-generation smartwatch, Pebble Time, which started shipping in May 2015.

Crowdfunding-backed start-up McLear invented the smart ring in 2013, with a campaign running on Kickstarter that raised more than $300k in funding. McLear was the first mover in wearables technology in introducing payments, bitcoin payments, advanced secure access control, quantified self data collection, biometric data tracking, and monitoring systems for the elderly.

In March 2014, Motorola unveiled the Moto 360 smartwatch powered by Android Wear, a modified version of the mobile operating system Android designed specifically for smartwatches and other wearables. Finally, following more than a year of speculation, Apple announced its own smartwatch, the Apple Watch, in September 2014.

Wearable technology was a popular topic at the trade show Consumer Electronics Show in 2014, with the event dubbed "The Wearables, Appliances, Cars and Bendable TVs Show" by industry commentators. Among numerous wearable products showcased were smartwatches, activity trackers, smart jewelry, head-mounted optical displays and earbuds. Nevertheless, wearable technologies are still suffering from limited battery capacity.

Another field of application of wearable technology is monitoring systems for assisted living and eldercare. Wearable sensors have a huge potential in generating big data, with a great applicability to biomedicine and ambient assisted living. For this reason, researchers are moving their focus from data collection to the development of intelligent algorithms able to glean valuable information from the collected data, using data mining techniques such as statistical classification and neural networks.

Wearable technology can also collect biometric data such as heart rate (ECG and HRV), brainwave (EEG), and muscle bio-signals (EMG) from the human body to provide valuable information in the field of health care and wellness.

Another increasingly popular wearable technology involves virtual reality. VR headsets have been made by a range of manufacturers for computers, consoles, and mobile devices. Recently Google released their headset, the Google Daydream.

In addition to commercial applications, wearable technology is being researched and developed for a multitude of uses. The Massachusetts Institute of Technology is one of the many research institutions developing and testing technologies in this field. For example, research is being done to improve haptic technology for its integration into next-generation wearables. Another project focuses on using wearable technology to assist the visually impaired in navigating their surroundings.

As wearable technology continues to grow, it has begun to expand into other fields. The integration of wearables into healthcare has been a focus of research and development for various institutions. Wearables continue to evolve, moving beyond devices and exploring new frontiers such as smart fabrics. Applications involve using a fabric to perform a function such as integrating a QR code into the textile, or performance apparel that increases airflow during exercise

Entertainment 

Wearables have expanded into the entertainment space by creating new ways to experience digital media. Virtual reality headsets and augmented reality glasses have come to exemplify wearables in entertainment. The influence of these virtual reality headsets and augmented reality glasses are seen mostly in the gaming industry during the initial days, but are now used in the fields of medicine and education.

Virtual reality headsets such as the Oculus Rift, HTC Vive, and Google Daydream View aim to create a more immersive media experience by either simulating a first-person experience or displaying the media in the user's full field of vision. Television, films, video games, and educational simulators have been developed for these devices to be used by working professionals and consumers. In a 2014 expo, Ed Tang of Avegant presented his "Smart Headphones". These headphones use Virtual Retinal Display to enhance the experience of the Oculus Rift. Some augmented reality devices fall under the category of wearables. Augmented reality glasses are currently in development by several corporations. Snap Inc.'s Spectacles are sunglasses that record video from the user's point of view and pair with a phone to post videos on Snapchat. Microsoft has also delved into this business, releasing Augmented Reality glasses, HoloLens, in 2017. The device explores using digital holography, or holograms, to give the user a first hand experience of Augmented Reality. These wearable headsets are used in many different fields including the military.

Wearable technology has also expanded from small pieces of technology on the wrist to apparel all over the body. There is a shoe made by the company shiftwear that uses a smartphone application to periodically change the design display on the shoe. The shoe is designed using normal fabric but utilizes a display along the midsection and back that shows a design of your choice. The application was up by 2016 and a prototype for the shoes was created in 2017.

Another example of this can be seen with Atari's headphone speakers. Atari and Audiowear are developing a face cap with built in speakers. The cap will feature speakers built into the underside of the brim, and will have Bluetooth capabilities. Jabra has released earbuds, in 2018, that cancel the noise around the user and can toggle a setting called "hearthrough." This setting takes the sound around the user through the microphone and sends it to the user. This gives the user an augmented sound while they commute so they will be able to hear their surroundings while listening to their favorite music.  Many other devices can be considered entertainment wearables and need only be devices worn by the user to experience media.

Gaming 
The gaming industry has always incorporated new technology. The first technology used for electronic gaming was a controller for Pong. The way users game has continuously evolved through each decade. Currently, the two most common forms of gaming is either using a controller for video game consoles or a mouse and keyboard for PC games.

In 2012, virtual reality headphones were reintroduced to the public. VR headsets were first conceptualized in the 1950s and officially created in the 1960s. The creation of the first virtual reality headset can be credited to Cinematographer Morton Heilig. He created a device known as the Sensorama in 1962. The Sensorama was a videogame like device that was so heavy that it needed to be held up by a suspension device. There has been numerous different wearable technology within the gaming industry from gloves to foot boards. The gaming space has offbeat inventions. In 2016 Sony debuted its first portable, connectable virtual reality headset codenamed Project Morpheus. The device was rebranded for PlayStation in 2018. Early 2019 Microsoft debut their HoloLens 2 that goes beyond just virtual reality into mixed reality headset. Their main focus is to be use mainly by the working class to help with difficult tasks. These headsets are used by educators, scientists, engineers, military personnel, surgeons, and many more. Headsets such as the HoloLens 2 allows the user to see a projected image at multiple angles and interact with the image. This helps gives a hands on experience to the user, which otherwise, they would not be able to get.

Military 
Wearable technology within the military ranges from educational purposes, training exercises and sustainability technology.

The technology used for educational purposes within the military are mainly wearables that tracks a soldier's vitals. By tracking a soldier's heart rate, blood pressure, emotional status, etc. helps the research and development team best help the soldiers. According to chemist, Matt Coppock, he has started to enhance a soldier's lethality by collecting different biorecognition receptors. By doing so it will eliminate emerging environmental threats to the soldiers.

With the emergence of virtual reality it is only natural to start creating simulations using VR. This will better prepare the user for whatever situation they are training for. In the military there are combat simulations that soldiers will train on. The reason the military will use VR to train its soldiers is because it is the most interactive/immersive experience the user will feels without being put in a real situation. Recent simulations include a soldier wearing a shock belt during a combat simulation. Each time they are shot the belt will release a certain amount of electricity directly to the user's skin. This is to simulate a shot wound in the most humane way possible.

There are many sustainability technologies that military personnel wear in the field. One of which is a boot insert. This insert gauges how soldiers are carrying the weight of their equipment and how daily terrain factors impact their mission panning optimization. These sensors will not only help the military plan the best timeline but will help keep the soldiers at best physical/mental health.

Fashion 
Fashionable wearables are "designed garments and accessories that combines aesthetics and style with functional technology." Garments are the interface to the exterior mediated through digital technology. It allows endless possibilities for the dynamic customization of apparel. All clothes have social, psychological and physical functions. However, with the use of technology these functions can be amplified. There are some wearables that are called E-textiles. These are the combination of textiles(fabric) and electronic components to create wearable technology within clothing. They are also known as smart textile and digital textile.

Wearables are made from a functionality perspective or from an aesthetic perspective. When made from a functionality perspective, designers and engineers create wearables to provide convenience to the user. Clothing and accessories are used as a tool to provide assistance to the user. Designers and engineers are working together to incorporate technology in the manufacturing of garments in order to provide functionalities that can simplify the lives of the user. For example, through smartwatches people have the ability to communicate on the go and track their health. Moreover, smart fabrics have a direct interaction with the user, as it allows sensing the customers' moves. This helps to address concerns such as privacy, communication and well-being. Years ago, fashionable wearables were functional but not very aesthetic. As of 2018, wearables are quickly growing to meet fashion standards through the production of garments that are stylish and comfortable. Furthermore, when wearables are made from an aesthetic perspective, designers explore with their work by using technology and collaborating with engineers. These designers explore the different techniques and methods available for incorporating electronics in their designs. They are not constrained by one set of materials or colors, as these can change in response to the embedded sensors in the apparel. They can decide how their designs adapt and responds to the user.

In 1967 French fashion designer Pierre Cardin, known for his futuristic designs created a collection of garments entitled "robe electronique" that featured a geometric embroidered pattern with LEDs (light emitting diodes). Pierre Cardin unique designs were featured in an episode of the Jetsons animated show where one of the main characters demonstrates how her luminous "Pierre Martian" dress works by plugging it into the mains. An exhibition about the work of Pierre Cardin was recently on display at the Brooklyn Museum in New York

In 1968, the Museum of Contemporary Craft in New York City held an exhibition named Body Covering which presented the infusion of technological wearables with fashion. Some of the projects presented were clothing that changed temperature, and party dresses that light up and produce noises, among others. The designers from this exhibition creatively embedded electronics into the clothes and accessories to create these projects. As of 2018, fashion designers continue to explore this method in the manufacturing of their designs by pushing the limits of fashion and technology.

House of Holland and NFC Ring 
McLear, also known as NFC Ring, in partnership with the House of Henry Holland and Visa Europe Collab, showcased an event entitled "Cashless on the Catwalk" at the Collins Music Hall in Islington. Celebrities walking through the event could make purchases for the first time in history from a wearable device using McLear's NFC Rings by tapping the ring on a purchase terminal.

CuteCircuit 
CuteCircuit pioneered the concept of interactive and app-controlled fashion with the creation in 2008 of the Galaxy Dress (part of the permanent collection of the Museum of Science and Industry in Chicago, US) and in 2012 of the tshirtOS (now infinitshirt). CuteCircuit fashion designs can interact and change colour providing the wearer a new way of communicating and expressing their personality and style. CuteCircuit's designs have been worn on the red carpet by celebrities such as Katy Perry and Nicole Scherzinger. and are part of the permanent collections of the Museum of Fine Arts in Boston.

Project Jacquard 
Project Jacquard, a Google project led by Ivan Poupyrev, has been combining clothing with technology.  Google collaborated with Levi Strauss to create a jacket that has touch-sensitive areas that can control a smartphone. The cuff-links are removable and charge in a USB port.

Intel & Chromat 

Intel partnered with the brand Chromat to create a sports bra that responds to changes in the body of the user, as well as a 3D printed carbon fiber dress that changes color based on the user's adrenaline levels. Intel also partnered with Google and TAG Heuer to make a smart watch.

Iris van Herpen 

Smart fabrics and 3D printing have been incorporated in high fashion by the designer Iris van Herpen.  Van Herpen was the first designer to incorporate 3D printing technology of rapid prototyping into the fashion industry. The Belgian company Materialise NV collaborates with her in the printing of her designs.

Manufacturing process of e-textiles 
There are several methods which companies manufacture e-textiles from fiber to garment and the insertion of electronics to the process. One of the methods being developed is when stretchable circuits are printed right into a fabric using conductive ink. The conductive ink uses metal fragments in the ink to become electrically conductive. Another method would be using conductive thread or yarn. This development includes the coating of non-conductive fiber (like Polyester PET) with conductive material such as metal like gold or silver to produce coated yarns or in order to produce an e-textile.

Common fabrication techniques for e-textiles include the following traditional methods:

 Embroidery
 Sewing
 Weaving
 Non-woven
 Knitting
 Spinning
 Breading
 Coating
 Printing
 Laying

Issues and concerns 

The FDA drafted a guidance for low risk devices advises that personal health wearables are general wellness products if they only collect data on weight management, physical fitness, relaxation or stress management, mental acuity, self-esteem, sleep management, or sexual function. This was due to the privacy risks that were surrounding the devices. As more and more of the devices were being used as well as improved soon enough these devices would be able to tell if a person is showing certain health issues and give a course of action. With the rise of these devices being consumed so to the FDA drafted this guidance in order to decrease risk of a patient in case the app doesn't function properly. It is argued the ethics of it as well because although they help track health and promote independence there is still an invasion of privacy that ensues to gain information. This is due to the huge amounts of data that has to be transferred which could raise issues for both the user and the companies if a third partied gets access to this data. There was an issue with Google Glass that was used by surgeons in order to track vital signs of a patient where it had privacy issues relating to third party use of non-consented information. The issue is consent as well when it comes to wearable technology because it gives the ability to record and that is an issue when permission is not asked when a person is being recorded.

Compared to smartphones, wearable devices pose several new reliability challenges to device manufacturers and software developers. Limited display area, limited computing power, limited volatile and non-volatile memory, non-conventional shape of the devices, abundance of sensor data, complex communication patterns of the apps, and limited battery size—all these factors can contribute to salient software bugs and failure modes, such as, resource starvation or device hangs. Moreover, since many of the wearable devices are used for health purposes (either monitoring or treatment), their accuracy and robustness issues can give rise to safety concerns. Some tools have been developed to evaluate the reliability and the security properties of these wearable devices. The early results point to a weak spot of wearable software whereby overloading of the devices, such as through high UI activity, can cause failures.

See also

 Assistive technology
 Clothing technology
 Computer-mediated reality
 Cyborg
 Flexible electronics
 GPS watch
 Mixed reality
 Smart, connected products
 Wearable computer

References

External links
 "Wear your heart on your sleeve" - physics.org
 "The Future of Wearable Technology" - video by Off Book

 
Internet of things
Fashion accessories
Ambient intelligence
Human–computer interaction
Ubiquitous computing
Wearable computers